Getchell is an unincorporated community in Snohomish County, in the U.S. state of Washington.

History
Getchell was laid out in the 1890s by Lysander W. Getchell, and named for him.  A post office called Getchell was established in 1890, and remained in operation until 1918.

References

Unincorporated communities in Snohomish County, Washington
Unincorporated communities in Washington (state)